Basic Instinct is a 1992 thriller film.

Basic Instinct may also refer to:
Basic Instinct 2, a 2006 sequel to Basic Instinct
Basic Instinct (album), a 2010 album by American singer Ciara
"Basic Instinct (U Got Me)", a song from the above album

See also
Instinct (disambiguation)